Destrier is the second album by rock band Agent Fresco.

Critical reception
The album was well received by critics.

Track listing

Personnel

Musical performers
Arnór Dan Arnarson – vocals
Hrafnkell Örn Guðjónsson – drums, percussion
Vignir Rafn Hilmarsson – bass, upright bass
Þórarinn Guðnason – guitar, piano, programming
Viktor Orri Árnason, Þórarinn Guðnason – string arrangements
Viktor Orri Árnason – strings
Bergur Þórisson – brass

Additional personnel
Agent Fresco, Styrmir Hauksson – production
Styrmir Hauksson – engineering
Bergur Þórisson, Þórarinn Guðnason – additional engineering
Styrmir Hauksson – mixing
Glenn Schick – mastering
Dóri Andrésson – art direction, graphic design
Marino Thorlacius – photography

Year-end charts

References

2015 albums
Agent Fresco albums